New York Calling is an album by alto saxophonist Jackie McLean and the Cosmic Brotherhood recorded in 1974 and released on the SteepleChase label.

Reception
The Allmusic review by Jim Todd stated "Jackie McLean's band on New York Calling, the Cosmic Brotherhood, plays with uncompromising passion, fury, and intelligence. The group, a generation younger than the leader, has a sound that is definitive '70s advanced hard bop. ...It's to McLean's credit that the date bears the stamp of his band's artistry as much as it does his own".

Track listing
 All compositions by Billy Skinner except as indicated
 "New York Calling" - 10:14		
 "Star Dancer" - 12:25
 "Camel Driver" (Billy Gault) - 8:53		
 "Some Other Time" (Gault) - 8:03		
 "Adrians Dance" - 8:52		
 "New York Calling" [Take 3] - 10:50 Bonus track on CD reissue

Personnel
Jackie McLean – alto saxophone
Billy Skinner – trumpet, arranger
René McLean  – soprano saxophone, alto saxophone, tenor saxophone, and bass clarinet
Billy Gault – piano, arranger
James Benjamin – bass
Michael Carvin – drums

References

SteepleChase Records albums
Jackie McLean albums
1974 albums